Karimpuzha Sree Ramaswamy Temple (also known as the Dakshina Ayodhya) is located in Palakkad district, Kerala, India. It lies on the bank of the Karimpuzha River, a major tributary of the Bharathapuzha River.

The temple was owned by Kozhikode Samoodhiripad - Eralpad, the heir to become Samoodhiri, who had his "Kovilakam" in Karimpuzha. The temple has special offerings and pujas. It is believed that Rama renounced his life here in the river Karimpuzha (thus River Sarayu eventually). Rama is accompanied by Hanuman only during his last moments, which justifies the presence of Hanuman here. Later, the deity of Hanuman was placed inside the temple.

This is one of the rarest 'Mahakshetrams' in Kerala

See also 
 Temples of Kerala

External links 

Hindu temples in Palakkad district